is a railway station in Jōtō-ku, Osaka, Osaka Prefecture, Japan, and operated by West Japan Railway Company (JR West). The station was opened on 16 March 2019.

Lines
JR-Noe Station served by the Osaka Higashi Line, was completed on 16 March 2019.

Layout
The station has two side platforms, each capable of accommodating eight-car trains.

See also
 Noe-Uchindai Station on the Osaka Metro nearby
 Noe Station on the Keihan Railway nearby
 List of railway stations in Japan

References

External links
 Osaka Soto-kanjo Railway website 

Jōtō-ku, Osaka
Railway stations in Osaka
Stations of West Japan Railway Company
Railway stations in Japan opened in 2019